Diaphania semaphoralis is a moth in the family Crambidae. It was described by Paul Dognin in 1903. It is found in Costa Rica, Colombia, Bolivia, French Guiana and Peru.

The length of the forewings is 13–16 mm and 15 mm for females. The forewings are dark brown with a light purp1e gloss and a white transparent a1most triangular band. The hindwings have a white transparent band occupying three quarters of the wing.

References

Moths described in 1903
Diaphania